Salve Marinera is the official anthem of the Spanish Navy. Its meaning can be loosely translated as "Salutation of the seas" or "Praise song of the seas".

History
The Salve Marinera lyrics and music originated in the zarzuela "El Molinero de Subiza", by Cristóbal Oudrid in 1870.
The lyrics of this hymn, written by Mariano Méndez Vigo, are exalting the Virgin Mary as Stella Maris (Our Lady, Star of the Sea).
It was adopted by the Spanish Navy as its official anthem towards the end of the 19th century, at an uncertain date.

With the passing of the time this anthem has become very popular in nautical theme celebrations throughout coastal areas in Spain. It is sung as one of the highlights of Our Lady of Mount Carmel yearly commemorational festivities by fishermen on July 16. Mostly the singing of the Salve Marinera takes place after a procession carrying the Virgin's image to the church.

Lyrics
Despite its popularity in Catalonia and Galicia, the Salve Marinera has only a Castilian Spanish version; it does not exist in any of the other languages of Spain.
The present music accompanying the hymn was adapted in 1942 by Jesús Montalbán Vizcón, then director of the Spanish Navy's training facilities' musical band (Banda de Música de la Escuela Naval).

See also
Spanish Navy
Stella Maris
Ave Maris Stella

References

External links
Spanish Navy official site - Salve Marinera
Salve marinera - Anthem (by the Chorus of Infanteria de Marina and Escuela Nacional de Marineria) and Video

Spanish Navy
Marian hymns
Spanish military marches
Compositions by Cristóbal Oudrid